Jaap Kersten (born 10 November 1934) is a Dutch former professional racing cyclist. He rode in five editions of the Tour de France.

References

External links
 

1934 births
Living people
Dutch male cyclists
Cyclists from Limburg (Netherlands)
People from Bergen, Limburg